The Sybase Open Watcom Public Licence is a software license that has been approved by the Open Source Initiative.  It is the licence under which the Open Watcom C/C++ compiler is released.

The license has not been accepted as "free" under the Debian Free Software Guidelines, due to the license's termination clauses.

The Free Software Foundation has stated that the license is not "free" as it requires the source to be published when you "deploy" the software for private use only. In contrast, FSF's GPL does not require that modified source code has to be made public when the software modification was only used privately without a public release of the software. This makes the Watcom license also GPL incompatible and a stronger copyleft license than the GPL and even the AGPL.

The Fedora project also considers the license as non-free, citing the FSF argumentation.

History 
Version 1.0 appears to have been written in 2002. It's publicly released no later than January 8, 2003, the date of the initial release of Open Watcom C/C++.

The draft of version 2.0 of the Licence was published on 20 January 2004.  This version incorporated changes from Apple and made the licence less specific to OpenWatcom.

References

Further reading 
 

Free and open-source software licenses
Copyleft software licenses
2004 in law